Isle is a city in Mille Lacs County, Minnesota, United States. The population was 751 at the 2010 census.

History
A post office called Isle has been in operation since 1896. The city was named for the island near its harbor on Mille Lacs Lake.

Geography

Isle is locally known as the "walleye capital of the world" because of its position on the southeastern shore of Mille Lacs Lake.

Minnesota Highway 27 and Minnesota Highway 47 are two of the main routes in the community.

Schools 

Isle's school district is Isle Public Schools. The team name is the Mille Lacs Raiders. It used to be the Isle Huskies. There are three main schools in this district: Nyquist Elementary, Isle High School, and the Alternative Learning Center (ALC). The elementary school goes from pre-K to sixth grade. The high school goes from 7th to 12th grades. The ALC is an alternative secondary school. It is near Mille Lacs.

Demographics

2010 census
As of the census of 2010, there were 751 people, 352 households, and 195 families living in the city. The racial makeup of the city was 73.8% White, 22.6% Native American, 0.1% Asian, 0.8% from other races, and 2.7% from two or more races. Hispanic or Latino of any race were 3.1% of the population.

There were 352 households, of which 23.9% had children under the age of 18 living with them, 39.5% were married couples living together, 11.1% had a female householder with no husband present, 4.8% had a male householder with no wife present, and 44.6% were non-families. 39.2% of all households were made up of individuals, and 21.6% had someone living alone who was 65 years of age or older. The average household size was 2.13 and the average family size was 2.84.

The median age in the city was 47.5 years. 23.4% of residents were under the age of 18; 4.7% were between the ages of 18 and 24; 20% were from 25 to 44; 23.9% were from 45 to 64; and 28.2% were 65 years of age or older. The gender makeup of the city was 45.5% male and 54.5% female.

2000 census
As of the census of 2000, there were 707 people, 323 households, and 198 families living in the city. The racial makeup of the city was 87.13% White, 11.74% Native American, 0.14% Asian, and 0.99% from two or more races. Hispanic or Latino of any race were 0.42% of the population.

There were 323 households, out of which 23.2% had children under the age of 18 living with them, 46.4% were married couples living together, 10.5% had a female householder with no husband present, and 38.4% were non-families. 35.3% of all households were made up of individuals, and 21.1% had someone living alone who was 65 years of age or older. The average household size was 2.19 and the average family size was 2.81.

In the city, the population was spread out, with 22.2% under the age of 18, 7.4% from 18 to 24, 21.4% from 25 to 44, 24.2% from 45 to 64, and 24.9% who were 65 years of age or older. The median age was 44 years. For every 100 females, there were 91.6 males. For every 100 females age 18 and over, there were 87.1 males.

The median income for a household in the city was $32,375, and the median income for a family was $37,250. Males had a median income of $27,083 versus $21,731 for females. The per capita income for the city was $19,609. About 3.2% of families and 5.6% of the population were below the poverty line, including 2.8% of those under age 18 and 9.4% of those age 65 or over.

References

External links
City of Isle website - City of Isle information
 Mille Lacs Messenger - newspaper site serving Isle, Minnesota
 Hunter Winfield's Resort & Guide Service on Mille Lacs - resort located in Isle, Minnesota
 Red Beard Lumber Co. - a historic lumberyard being restored located in Isle, Minnesota
 Chapman's Mille Lacs Resort & Guide Service - resort located in Isle, Minnesota
Isle Photo Gallery - recent and historic photos of the Isle area
Mille Lacs Area Tourism Council website - resource for all your Mille Lacs Area information

Cities in Minnesota
Cities in Mille Lacs County, Minnesota